The 2002 MAAC men's basketball tournament was held March 1–4, 2002 at Pepsi Arena in Albany, New York.

Seventh-seeded  defeated  in the championship game, 92–77, to win their second MAAC men's basketball tournament.

The Saints received an automatic bid to the 2002 NCAA tournament.

Format
All ten of the conference's members participated in the tournament field. They were seeded based on regular season conference records.

Bracket

References

MAAC men's basketball tournament